Charm offensive may refer to:

 Charm. Offensive., a 2017 album by Die!_Die!_Die!
 Charm Offensive, a 2018 album by Damien Done
 Armando Iannucci's Charm Offensive, a BBC Radio comedy